Temperate Southern Africa is a biogeographic region of the Earth's seas, comprising the temperate waters of southern Africa, where the Atlantic Ocean and Indian Ocean meet. It includes the coast of South Africa and Namibia, and reaches into southern Angola. It also includes the remote islands of Amsterdam and Saint-Paul, to the east in the southern Indian Ocean.

Temperate Southern Africa is a marine realm, one of the great biogeographic divisions of the world's ocean basins.

The boundary between the Temperate Southern Africa and Western Indo-Pacific marine realms is near Lake St. Lucia, in South Africa near the border with Mozambique. The realm extends up the Atlantic coast of Africa to Tômbua in southern Angola, where it transitions to the Tropical Atlantic realm.

Subdivisions
The Temperate Southern Africa realm is further subdivided into three marine provinces. Benguela province includes the Atlantic portion of the realm, influenced by the cold Benguela Current. Aghulhas province includes the rest of the South Africa's southern and eastern coasts which are influenced by the warm Agulhas Current. The Cape of Good Hope is the boundary between the Benguela and Agulhas provinces. Amsterdam and St. Paul islands are a separate province.

The Benguela and Agulhas marine provinces are divided into two marine ecoregions.

 Benguela province
 Namib ecoregion
 Namaqua ecoregion
 Agulhas province
 Agulhas ecoregion
 Natal ecoregion
 Amsterdam–St Paul province
 Amsterdam–St Paul ecoregion

See also 
Marine ecoregions of the South African exclusive economic zone

References
 Spalding, Mark D., Helen E. Fox, Gerald R. Allen, Nick Davidson et al. "Marine Ecoregions of the World: A Bioregionalization of Coastal and Shelf Areas". Bioscience Vol. 57 No. 7, July/August 2007, pp. 573–583.

 
Marine realms
Atlantic Ocean
Indian Ocean